Mouloud Hamrouche (born 3 January 1943 in Constantine, Algeria) was the head of government of Algeria from 9 September 1989 to 5 June 1991.

Biography 
He was born in Constantine, Algeria. He was a leading member of the FLN. However, after serving as head of government of Algeria he became involved in serious disputes with other party leaders who he said were too close to the army. He ran unsuccessfully as an independent in the 1999 presidential elections.

As prime minister in early 1991, he attempted to limit the power of the military and security forces and was for that reason forced from power in June.

A decade after the military dictatorship had denied the FIS its electoral victory, Hamrouche sympathetically described the events of 1991 as a period with its excesses necessary for a people who had just been "liberated" after "being prevented from speaking for 30 years."

References

External links 
  Hamrouche Comity

1943 births
Living people
People from Constantine, Algeria
National Liberation Front (Algeria) politicians
21st-century Algerian people